Sumgayit FK is an Azerbaijani football club based in Sumgayit that plays in the Azerbaijan Premier League.

History
The club was founded in 2010 as Sumgayit FK. In May 2011, the team secured their promotion to Azerbaijan Premier League after getting wildcard place instead of defunct Absheron. After securing promotion to the Premier League, the club based most of their squad on players from Azerbaijan's U-19 and U-17 players. In January 2012, the club announced that its old name was being restored.

During 2012–13 season, Sumgayit narrowly avoided relegation to the First Division by finishing 10th in the league.

In the 2017-18 season, they were the only team in the league consisting solely of Azerbaijani players.

On 15 January 2019, Sumgayit announced they had signed a cooperation with Tractor Sazi.

Domestic history

European history

Notes
 1QR: First qualifying round
 2QR: Second qualifying round
 3QR: Third qualifying round
 POR: Play-off round
 Group: Group stage

Logos

Stadium

The club's home ground is Kapital Bank Arena, a Football stadium in Sumqayit, which has a capacity of 1,300. New stadium will be ready in 2021 summer with capacity 16,000.

Supporters
Sumgayit get most of their support in the Absheron District, particularly the city of Sumgayit. The club also enjoys support from fans scattered all over the city, and the local area in general.

Players

Azerbaijani teams are limited to nine players without Azerbaijani citizenship. The squad list includes only the principal nationality of each player; several non-European players on the squad have dual citizenship with an EU country.

Current squad

For recent transfers, see Transfers summer 2022.

Reserve team

Sumgayit-2 plays in the Azerbaijan First Division from 2018.

Club officials

Management

Coaching staff

Managers

Statistics
Information correct as of match played 30 January 2023. Only competitive matches are counted.

Notes:
P – Total of played matches
W – Won matches
D – Drawn matches
L – Lost matches
GS – Goal scored
GA – Goals against
%W – Percentage of matches won

Nationality is indicated by the corresponding FIFA country code(s).

Records

References

External links
Official website

 
Football clubs in Azerbaijan
Sport in Sumgait
Association football clubs established in 2010
2010 establishments in Azerbaijan